Go Fighting! is a Chinese variety show broadcast on SMG: Dragon Television. It was first aired June 14, 2015. Go Fighting! is classified as a game-variety-reality show, and the MCs and guests complete missions at a landmark to win the objective. Usually each episode will also have an over-arching theme or story. Each episode varies in the challenges and the instructions given to the MCs, and rules are not strictly enforced, resulting in a largely unscripted show.

History 
The show has been a commercial and critical success since its inception, and the MCs have received praise for 'breaking the rules' of usual variety game shows and mingling with normal people going about their daily lives. The first and second seasons averaged ratings of 8.9/10 and 9.1/10 on China's main review-based social network site Douban.

The show's catch phrases are "This is fate / 这就是命" and "This is love / 这就是爱" with a corresponding action that resembles the Chinese character for 'fate / 命'. Go Fighting! has been called the Chinese version of the popular Korean variety show Infinite Challenge; this comparison has led to minor controversies.

Personnel
In March 2019, it was reported that original director Yan Min and cast members Huang Bo and Sun Honglei have decided to temporarily back out of the show after Season 4 due to scheduling conflicts. Huang Lei stated he would only be present for 3 episodes due to acting commitments. They were replaced by Lei Jiayin, Yue Yunpeng and Dilraba Dilmurat.

In March 2020, Season 6 began filming with a brand new cast consisting of Lei Jiayin, Guo Jingfei, Jia Nailiang, Yue Yunpeng, and Deng Lun. Wang Xun and Zhang Yixing ("Lay") were the only original cast members left.

Current Cast

Original Cast

Relationships

List of episodes 
If more than one set of teams are used other than the Race Mission teams, they are divided and distinguished to the corresponding mission under Teams. Team members are listed in alphabetical order from Team Leader, to Members, to Guests. As some episodes consisted of road missions and were not confined to a single landmark nor was a landmark officially recognized on-air, the landmark shown for those episodes is the final mission venue.

Series overview

List of episodes

List of guests 
The following is a compilation of guests and the number of time they have been on the show. They are listed in order of appearance.

Daniela Anahí Bessia Guest

Ratings

First Season 

|-
|1/01	
| June 14, 2015
|1.191	
|4.55
|2
|-	
|1/02	
| June 21, 2015
|1.650	
|5.26
|2
|-	
|1/03	
| June 28, 2015
|1.854	
|6.21
|1
|-	
|1/04	
| July 5, 2015
|2.127	
|6.83
|1	
|-
|1/05	
| July 12, 2015	
|2.379	
|7.90
|1	
|-	
|1/06
| July 19, 2015	
|2.742
|9.24
|1
|-
|1/07	
| July 26, 2015	
|2.570		
|8.75	
|1
|-	
|1/08	
| August 2, 2015
|2.718
|8.54
|1	
|-	
|1/09
| August 9, 2015
|2.900	
|8.73	
|1
|-
|1/10
| September 6, 2015
|1.540	
|4.73
|3	
|-	
|1/11
| September 13, 2015
|2.026
|6.71	
|1	
|-
|1/12
| September 20, 2015	
|2.110
|6.82	
|1

Second Season

|-	
|2/01	
| April 17, 2016	
|2.076	
|6.73	
|1	
|-	
|2/02	
| April 24, 2016	
|2.025	
|6.42	
|1	
|-	
|2/03	
| May 1, 2016	
|2.472	
|7.74	
|1	
|-	
|2/04	
| May 8, 2016	
|2.419	
|7.69	
|1	
|-	
|2/05	
| May 15, 2016	
|2.099	
|6.60	
|1	
|-	
|2/06	
| May 22, 2016	
|1.991	
|6.34	
|1	
|-	
|2/07	
| May 29, 2016	
|2.052	
|6.60	
|1	
|-	
|2/08	
| June 5, 2016	
|2.079	
|6.34	
|1	
|-	
|2/09	
| June 12, 2016	
|1.875	
|6.08	
|1	
|-	
|2/10	
| June 19, 2016	
|1.862	
|6.45	
|2	
|-	
|2/11	
| June 26, 2016	
|2.394	
|7.81	
|1	
|-	
|2/12	
| July 3, 2016	
|2.969	
|9.60	
|1

Third season 

|-
|3/01	
| July 9, 2017
|1.606
|7.73
|1
|-	
|3/02	
| July 16, 2017
|1.587
|7.69
|2
|-	
|3/03	
| July 23, 2017
|1.436
|7.12
|1
|-	
|3/04	
| July 30, 2017
|1.506
|7.46
|1
|-
|3/05	
| August 6, 2017	
|1.615
|8.56
|1	
|-	
|3/06
| August 13, 2017	
|1.314
|6.85
|1
|-
|3/07	
| August 20, 2017	
|1.190
|6.24
|1
|-	
|3/08	
| August 27, 2017
|1.095
|6.80
|1	
|-	
|3/09
| September 3, 2017
|1.124
|7.10
|3
|-
|3/10
| November 3, 2017
|0.580
|3.91
|7	
|-	
|3/11
| November 10, 2017
|0.447
|2.69
|9
|-
|3/12
| November 17, 2017	
|0.474
|2.54
|9

Fourth Season

|-	
|4/01	
| April 29, 2018
|1.120
|4.22
|2
|-
|4/02	
| May 6, 2018
|1.000
|3.84
|2
|-	
|4/03	
| May 13, 2018
|1.269
|5.41
|1
|-	
|4/04	
| May 20, 2018
|1.245
|6.62
|1
|-	
|4/05	
| May 27, 2018
|1.146
|4.71
|2
|-	
|4/06	
| June 3, 2018
|1.175
|4.82
|2
|-	
|4/07	
| June 10, 2018
|1.197
|5.19
|2
|-	
|4/08	
| June 17, 2018
|1.134
|4.28
|1
|-	
|4/09	
| June 24, 2018
|1.482
|5.60
|1
|-	
|4/10	
| July 1, 2018
|1.800
|6.68
|1
|-	
|4/11	
| July 8, 2018
|1.805
|6.98
|1
|-	
|4/12	
| July 15, 2018
|1.484
|5.56
|1

Accolades

Controversy
Season 1 of Go Fighting was accused of plagiarizing popular Korean variety show Infinite Challenge, causing a halt in production for almost a month, with episode 10 airing on September 6, 28 days after episode 9.

Season 3 of Go Fighting was pulled from air by SARFT a few days before Episode 10 was due to broadcast, and it was reportedly due to the promotion of undesirable social attitudes and a heavy focus on entertainment that didn't reflect the lives of ordinary people.

References

External links 
 Official Weibo 

Chinese variety television shows
2015 Chinese television series debuts
Television shows involved in plagiarism controversies
Chinese television-related lists